The following is the list of laws passed by the 14th Congress of the Philippines:

+14th Congress
Presidency of Gloria Macapagal Arroyo
History of the Congress of the Philippines